The splitbanded goby (Gymneleotris seminuda) is a species of goby from the family Gobiidae which is native to the Pacific coast of the Americas from Baja California to Ecuador. This species grows to a length of  TL. This species is the only known member of its genus.

References

Gobiidae
Fish described in 1864
Taxa named by Albert Günther